The State Prize of the Russian Federation, officially translated in Russia as Russian Federation National Award, is a state honorary prize established in 1992 following the breakup of the Soviet Union. In 2004 the rules for selection of laureates and the status of the award were significantly changed, making them closer to such awards as the Nobel Prize or the Soviet Lenin Prize.

Every year seven prizes are awarded:
 Three prizes in science and technology (according to newspaper Kommersant there was a fourth 2008 State Prize for Science and Technology awarded by a special decree of President Dmitri Medvedev but the name of the winner is kept secret because of the confidential character of the work);
 Three prizes in literature and the arts;
 One prize for humanitarian work (established in 2005).
Only three prizes for humanitarian work have been awarded so far: to Patriarch Alexius II, Primate of the Russian Orthodox Church (2005), to Russian writer Aleksandr Solzhenitsyn (2006) and to French President Jacques Chirac (2007).

The award consists of a cash prize amounting to 5 million Russian rubles (approximately $200,000), a medal and a certificate. If a number of coauthors equally contributed to a prize-winning work the prize is divided among no more than three authors.

The prize is presented by the President of Russia in a ceremony held in Grand Kremlin Palace at the Moscow Kremlin, on 12 June, Russia Day, which is broadcast by the major channels in the country.

Medal
The medal for the State Prize was developed by the artist Yevgeny Ukhnalyov (Евгений Ухналёв). The design is based on the coat of arms of Russia. It shows a gold double-headed eagle holding a scepter and a globus cruciger with a red shield depicting St. George and the Dragon. The eagle is crowned by two small and one large crown and put on a silver wreath consisted of palm and laurel branches joined by a red ribbon. The design was adopted in 2005.

Selected laureates 
Complete listings are available on Russian Wikipedia; for example: Laureates of the State Prize of the Russian Federation for 1992, over 60 names of recipients.

1992 
Literature and the arts
 Sofia Gubaidulina, for Offertorium
 Rodion Shchedrin, for The sealed angel

1993 
Literature and the arts
 Fazil Iskander

1995 
Literature and the arts
 Mikhail Gasparov
Science and technology
 Svyatoslav Gabuda
 Aleksandr Starovoitov

1996 
Literature and the arts
 Slava Zaitsev

1997 
Science and technology
 Valentin Panteleimonovich Smirnov

1998
 Oleg Anikanov
Inna Lisnyanskaya

1999 
 Fyodor Bunkin, Vitaly Konov, Vadim Fedorov, Nikolay Generalov, Gennady Kozlov, Yuri Raizer, for discovering of laser burning and continuous optical discharge
 Anatoly Savin

2001 (for 2000)
Literature and the arts
 Andrey Logvin
Vladimir Voinovich, for Monumental Propaganda 
Andrey Volos, for

2002 (for 2001) 
Literature and the arts
 Yelena Panova, for her role in Border. Taiga Romance

2003 (for 2002)
Literature and the arts
 Vatslav Mikhalsky, for his novel The Spring in Carthage
Science and technology
 Alexander Sergeevitch Gasparov, for development and practical implementation of endoscopic methods in gynecology
 Viktor Sadovnichiy

2004 (for 2003)
Science and technology
 Alexei Fridman, V. Afanasiev, S. Dodonov, Anatolii Zasov, Valerij Polyachenko, Olga Silchenko, Evgenii Snezhkin, Oleg Khoruzhii, for prediction and discovery of new structures in spiral galaxies

2005 (for 2004)
Science and technology
 Alexander Kvasnikov, Valery Kolinko, Arkady Vershkin, creation of optics-electronic complex for control of the outer space
 Vyachelav Molodin and Natalia Polosmak, for discovering of the Pazyryk culture
 Ludvig Faddeev, for development of mathematical physics
Literature and the arts
 Bella Akhmadulina, for poetry
 Leonid Krasnochyev and Ninel Kuzmina, for restoration of the Assumption Church in Veliky Novgorod
 Anna Netrebko, for her opera works

2006 (for 2005)
Humanitarian work
 Patriarch Alexius II, for his enlightening and peacemaking activities
Science and technology
 Igor Gorynin, for development of new construction materials
 Alexander Skrinsky, director of the Budker Institute of Nuclear Physics, for development in high energy physics
Literature and the arts
 Aleksey Batalov, for cinema works
 Nurlan Khanetov, Leonid Lyubavsky, Renat Kharis, for developing of national epic traditions
 Mikhail Pletnyov, for his performances and innovations in music culture

2007 (for 2006)
Humanitarian work
 Aleksandr Solzhenitsyn, for his humanitarian work
Science and technology
 Yury Vasiliyevich Gulyayev and Vladislav Pustovoyt, for developments in acousto-electronics and acousto-optics
 Sergey Nikitich Kovalyov and Igor Spassky (both from the Rubin Design Bureau), David Pashayev, for development of Nuclear submarines
 Alexander Nikolayevich Konovalov, director of Burdenko Central neurosurgical institute, for new methods neurosurgery
Literature and the arts
 Nikolay Borodacheyov, Irina Vasina, Vladimir Dmitriev from Gosfilmofond
 Olga Borodina, for her contributions to the world musical art
 Svetlana Zakharova, for her ballet works

2008 (for 2007)
According to the newspaper Kommersant there was a fourth State Prize for Science and Technology awarded by a special decree of President Dmitri Medvedev but the name of the winner is kept secret because of the confidential character of the work.

Science and technology
Vladimir Arnold, Russian mathematician
Andrey Zaliznyak, Russian linguist
, polymer scientist

Literature and arts
Vladimir Petrovich Gritsenko and Andrey Nikolayevich Naumov, researchers from the Museum of Battle of Kulikovo

Andrey Kovalchuk, Russian sculptor
Alisa Freindlich, actress of the Tovstonogov Theater in Saint Petersburg

Humanitarian activity
Jacques Chirac

2009 (for 2008)

Science and technology
 Yevgeny Kaspersky, anti-virus software inventor
 
 
 
Alexei Fridman

Literature and arts
 Dmitry Liss

Humanitarian assistance
Valentina Tereshkova

2010 (for 2009)

Science and technology
 
 

Valentin Parmon

Literature and arts

Yevgeny Yevtushenko
Denis Matsuev

2011 (for 2010)

Science and technology
 Valentin Gapontsev, for a complex of innovative developments and the creation of a high-tech production of fiber lasers and fiber-optic trunk and local communication systems

Literature and arts
, for his contribution to the preservation and popularization of cultural heritage, the development of traditions and the modernization of national cinema education
, Molotkov, Valentin Alekseevich and Inatullin, Oleg Zagitovich, for outstanding contribution to the preservation and restoration of unique museum watches and musical mechanisms, the revival of the traditions of Russian masters
 Yevgeny Mironov, for his contribution to the development of domestic theater and cinema

Humanitarian activity
Juan Carlos I of Spain

2012 (for 2011)

Science and technology
Felix Mitrofanov, for scientific study and discovery of large deposits of platinum-palladium ore in the Kola Peninsula
Rem Petrov and Rahim Khaitov, for outstanding achievements in scientific and practical development of the domestic immunology
Sergey Fedotovich Boyev, Sergey Dmitrievich Saprykin and Valery Ivanovich Karasev, for the development and creation of high-readiness radar stations of the missile attack warning system

Literature and arts
For contribution to the popularization of the achievements of culture and science, outstanding educational activities:

Svyatoslav Belza
For contribution to the revival and development of traditional cultural and historical values:

Nikolay Aleksandrovich Mukhin
 Galina Malanicheva, for her contribution to the preservation of the national cultural heritage

Humanitarian activities
Vladimir Spivakov

2013 (for 2012)

Science and technology
Anatoly Derevyanko, for outstanding discoveries and works in the field of ancient history in Eurasia and the formation of anatomically modern humans
For a cycle of fundamental work in the field of studying biological diversity, its conservation and environmental safety:

For the creation of a new class of highly radiation-resistant materials for nuclear reactor vessels and methods for extending their service life:

For the creation of the Yars strategic missile system:

Literature and arts
, for his contribution to the development of domestic documentary films
Tahir Salahov, for his contribution to the development of fine art
Karen Shakhnazarov, for his contribution to the development of Russian cinema, the revival and development of the Mosfilm film studio

Humanitarian activity
Valentin Rasputin

2014 (for 2013)

Science and technology
Anatoly Grigoriev
Viktor Maslov, for his outstanding contribution to the development of mathematics and the development of the mathematical foundations of modern thermodynamics
, for the fundamental results of research on the history of relations between Russia and Europe of the 19th and 20th centuries, as well as for his major contribution to the development of new conceptual approaches to teaching history in secondary and higher education

Literature and arts
Yuri Bashmet, for contribution to the development of domestic and world culture
Fazil Iskander, for contribution to the development of domestic literature
For the creation of the feature film Legend No. 17:

Nikolai Lebedev

Humanitarian activity
Yevgeny Primakov

2015 (for 2014)

Science and technology

Gennady Krasnikov
Valery Tishkov

Literature and arts
Tamara Melnikova
 Alexander Sokurov
Chulpan Khamatova

Humanitarian activity
 Aleksandra Pakhmutova

2016 (for 2015)

Science and technology
Eric M. Galimov, for the development of the scientific direction “geochemistry of carbon isotopes”, the theory of diamond formation, for research in the field of oil and gas geology and biogeochemical processes
 and Eugene D. Sverdlov, for the development and implementation of a set of technologies for analyzing the structure and functions of complex genomes
, for a cycle of fundamental and applied work on the study of molecular mediators of immunity, including work on the creation of unique biomedical models

Literature and arts
Lev Dodin, for his contribution to the development of domestic and world theater art
, Director General of the Kuban Cossack Choir, for his contribution to the preservation of traditions and the development of domestic musical art
Sergei Ursuliak, for his contribution to the development of domestic cinema

Humanitarian activity
Valery Gergiev

2017 (for 2016)

Science and technology
Vladimir Bogdanov,  and Anatoly Nuryayev, for the creation of rational systems for the development of gas and oil fields in Western Siberia
Amiran Revishvili, and Evgeny Pokushalov, for the scientific substantiation and introduction into clinical practice of a new concept for reducing morbidity and mortality among patients with cardiac arrhythmias
Nikolai Shakura, and Rashid Sunyaev, for the creation of the theory of disk accretion of matter into black holes

Literature and arts
Eduard Artemyev, for his contribution to the development of domestic and world musical art
Yury Grigorovich, for his outstanding contribution to the development of domestic and world choreographic art
Mikhail Piotrovsky, for his contribution to the preservation of domestic and world cultural heritage

Humanitarian activity
Daniil Granin

2018 (for 2017)

Science and technology
Mikhail Alfimov, Sergey Gromov and Aleksandr Chibisov, for the development of photoactive supramolecular devices and machines
Ivan Dedov, for a cycle of work on fundamental endocrinology and the introduction of an innovative model of personalized medicine in health
Yevgenii Rogayev, for the discovery of genes and molecular genetic mechanisms responsible for human hereditary diseases

Literature and arts
Svetlana Sikova, for her contribution to the study, preservation and promotion of marine heritage
Yura Temirkanov, for outstanding contribution to the development of domestic and world musical culture
Boris Eifman, for his contribution to the development of domestic and world choreographic art

Humanitarian activity
Irina Antonova

2019 (for 2018)

Science and technology
Valery Mitrofanov, Vladislav Pustovoyt and Yefim Khazanov, for creating the fundamental foundations and instrumental solutions to problems of registration of gravitational waves
Vladimir Porkhanov, Vladimir Parshin and Vladimir Kharchenko, for the scientific substantiation and introduction into clinical practice of a new concept for reducing morbidity and mortality in patients with stenotic diseases of the trachea
Vitaly Naumkin, for his outstanding contribution to oriental studies (Arabic studies and Islamic studies)

Literature and arts
Pavel Basinsky
Nikolai Lugansky
Yelena Shatkovskaya

Humanitarian activity
Rodion Shchedrin

2020 (for 2019)
The winners of the State Prize of the Russian Federation for 2019 were named by decrees of the President of the Russian Federation and announced on June 18, 2020 The ceremony took place on June 24, 2020 in the Catherine Hall of the Senate Palace in the Moscow Kremlin.

Science and technology 
Dmitry Morozov, Director General of Biocad
Tatyana Chernovskaya, Director of the Department of Biochemistry of Biocad
Andrei Ulitin, Acting Researcher at the Institute of Biological Instrument Engineering with Experimental Production of the Russian Academy of Sciences
Dmitry Markovich, academician
Mikhail Predtechensky, academician
Vladimir Meledin, doctor of technical sciences
Andrei Golovnev, director of the Peter the Great Museum of Anthropology and Ethnography

Literature and arts 
Alexander Ermakov, Director of the Museum-Estate S.V. Rakhmaninov "Ivanovka"
Valentin Kurbatov, writer and literary critic
Galina Medvedeva

Humanitarian activity
David Tukhmanov, head doctor of the Filatov Valery Vechorko City Clinical Hospital No. 15

2021 (for 2020)

Science and technology 
Eugene Alexandrov, head of the laboratory of the A.F. Ioffe Physico-Technical Institute and Valery Zapassky, leading researcher in I. N. Uraltsev Research Laboratory of Spin Optics
Alexander Gintsburg, Sergey Borisevich and Denis Logunov, for the development and implementation of effective recombinant vaccines against Ebola and COVID-19 into domestic health care practice

Literature and arts 
Hilarion (Alfeyev), metropolitan of Volokolamsk (Russian Orthodox Church)
Hibla Gerzmava, opera singer
Alexander Rukavishnikov, sculptor

2022 (for 2021)

Science and technology
Vladimir Travush, David Zaridze, Alexander Grigoryevich Rumyantsev Ivan Stilidi, Alexander Archakov and Andrei Lisitsa.

Literature and arts
Pavel Nikonov, painter, Gulzada Rudenko and Viktor Moskvin

Humanitarian activity
Margarita Urmancheyeva and Yelizaveta Oleshkina.

Notes

References

External links 
  Государственные премии Российской Федерации в области науки и технологий и в области литературы и искусства

 
Civil awards and decorations of Russia
Russia-related lists